The Perth slider (Lerista lineata)  is a species of skink found in Western Australia.

References

Lerista
Reptiles described in 1833
Taxa named by Thomas Bell (zoologist)